Felkel is an unincorporated community in Leon County, Florida, United States.It is the town that Bradley’s Country Store is located in, which is a country store locate southwest of the town Felkel

Notes

Unincorporated communities in Leon County, Florida
Unincorporated communities in Florida